General Hugo Montgomery Cederschiöld (25 September 1878 – 17 March 1968) was a senior officer in the Swedish Army. He served as commander of Svea Life Guards (1936–1938), as Commandant of Stockholm (1938–1945) and as Defence District Commander of Stockholm Defence District (1942–1945) and Norrtälje Defence District (1943–1945). Cederschiöld also served as Chief of His Majesty's Military Staff (1950–1963). He also competed at the 1912 Summer Olympics.

Early life
Cederschiöld was born on 25 September 1878 in Stockholm, Sweden, the son of Staffan Cederschiöld, the Director-General of the Swedish Customs, and his wife Sophie (née Montgomery Cederhielm). He was the brother of Pehr Cederschiöld, a district judge.

Career

Military career
Cederschiöld was commissioned as an officer in Svea Life Guards (I 1) in 1898 with the rank of second lieutenant. He was promoted to lieutenant in 1903 when he was commanded to serve the Duke of Skåne. The year after Cederschiöld was an orderly officer to the Duke of Skåne. He attended the Royal Swedish Army Staff College from 1906 to 1908 and served as regimental adjutant in 1908. Cederschiöld was 1st adjutant at the staff of the IV Army Division (IV. arméfördelningen) from 1911 to 1915. He was promoted to captain in 1912 and served as adjutant to the Crown Prince the same year. Cederschiöld served as brigade quartermaster in the 7th Infantry Brigade from 1917 to 1922. Cederschiöld was expert and secretary of the Shooting Instruction Committee in 1918. He was teacher at the Infantry Combat School from 1919 to 1923, expert and secretary in the Drill Regulations Committee from 1921 to 1922 and was promoted to major in 1921 before serving at Svea Life Guards (I 1) in 1922. Cederschiöld was again expert and secretary of the Shooting Instruction Committee from 1922 to 1923 and in the Drill Regulations Committee from 1923 to 1924. In 1924, he was appointed battalion commander in Svea Life Guards (I 1). He was promoted to lieutenant colonel in 1926 and was the head of Swedish Infantry Combat School from 1926 to 1931. In 1930, Cederschiöld was promoted to colonel and was the chief of staff of the Crown Prince the same year. He was commanding officer of Life Regiment Grenadiers (I 3) from 1931 to 1936. 

Cederschiöld was promoted to colonel in 1936 and was appointed commanding officer of Svea Life Guards from 16 November 1936. He was promoted to major general in the army on 30 April 1937, active from 1 July 1937. On 14 January 1938, it was decided that Cederschiöld would leave his post from 1 October 1938 to become the Commandant of Stockholm from the same date until 30 September 1943. In 1940, he briefly served as Acting Inspector of the Infantry. From 1 October 1942, Cederschiöld served as Commandant of Stockholm and Defence District Commander of Stockholm Defence District. From 1 October 1943 until 1 April 1945, Cederschiöld served as Commandant of Stockholm, Defence District Commander of Stockholm Defence District and of Norrtälje Defence District. In November 1950, Cederschiöld was appointed 1st Adjutant and Chief of His Majesty's Military Staff and was promoted to lieutenant general in the reserve, where he remained until 31 December 1954. He served as 1st Adjutant and Chief of His Majesty's Military Staff until 23 May 1963. Cederschiöld was promoted to general in the army on the same date.

Other work

Cederschiöld was a member of numerous committees and was active in the Frivilliga Skytterörelsen (lit. Voluntary Shooting Movement) and the Landstormen. He became a member of the Royal Swedish Academy of War Sciences in 1929. Cederschiöld was also president of the Swedish-English Association from 1939 to 1955 and president of Stockholm's Rotary Club from 1940 to 1941 and governor of Sweden's Rotary District number 78A (later 84) from 1948 to 1950. Cederschiöld was also member of the European Rotary International Council from 1948 and was chairman of numerous associations.

Cederschiöld competed in two Shooting events at the 1912 Summer Olympics.

Personal life
In 1908 he married Baroness Margareta Wrangel von Brehmer (1888–1967), the daughter of the senior valet de chambre (överstekammarjunkare), Baron Wolmer Wrangel von Brehmer and Countess Ingeborg Ehrensvärd. He was the father of Wolmer (1910–1985), Hugo (1915–1982), Margareta (born 1921) and Ingeborg (1923–2007).

Death
Cederschiöld died on 17 March 1968 and was buried at Hyby New Church in Scania.

Dates of rank
1898-12-09: Underlöjtnant
1903-01-30: Lieutenant
1912-04-12: Captain
1921-10-07: Major
1926-06-04: Lieutenant colonel
1930-05-23: Colonel
1937-04-30: Major general
1950-??-??: Lieutenant general
1963-05-23: General

Awards and decorations

Swedish
   Crown Prince Gustaf V and Crown Princess Silver Wedding Medal (1906)
   King Oscar II and Queen Sofia's Golden Wedding Medal (1907)
   King Gustaf V's Jubilee Commemorative Medal (1928)
   King Gustaf V's Jubilee Commemorative Medal (1948)
   Commander Grand Cross of the Order of the Sword (6 June 1945)
   Commander 1st Class of the Order of the Sword (6 June 1936)
   Commander 2nd Class of the Order of the Sword (16 June 1933)
   Knight of the Order of the Sword (6 June 1919)
   Commander 1st Class of the Order of Vasa (6 June 1941)
   Officer of the Order of Vasa (6 June 1924)
   Knight of the Order of the Polar Star (10 December 1928)
   Home Guard Medal of Merit in gold (6 July 1957)
  Officers Target Shooting Association's Gold Medal (Officerarnes målskjutningsförbunds guldmedalj) (1918)
  Shooting Badge in gold (1904)
  Sports Badge in gold (1912)

Foreign
   Grand Cross of the Order of the Dannebrog
   Commander 1st Class of the Order of the Dannebrog
  Grand Cross of the Order of the Star of Ethiopia
   Grand Cross of the Order of the Lion of Finland
   Grand Cross of the Order of the Falcon (22 April 1954)
   Grand Cross of the Order of the House of Orange (April 1955)
   Grand Cross of the Order of St. Olav (1 July 1952)
   Grand Cross of the Order of the Crown
   Knight Grand Cross of the Royal Victorian Order
   Grand Cross of the Order of Homayoun
   Badge of Honorary Knight Commander of the Civil Division of the Most Excellent Order of the British Empire (29 June 1948)
   Commander of the Order of Leopold II
   Commander of the Order of the White Rose of Finland (2 October 1956)
   Commander of the Crosses of Military Merit White Decoration
   Knight Second Class of the Order of the Zähringer Lion with oak leafes (July 1909)
   Knight of the Legion of Honour (1925)
   Knight of the Order of the Redeemer (1920)
   Knight 2nd Class of the House and Merit Order of Peter Frederick Louis with Crown (1912)
   Knight 3rd Class of the Order of the Crown (1912)
   Knight of the Order of the Dannebrog (31 October 1903)
  Knight of the Order of the White Star (1924)
  Officer of the Royal Victorian Order (1920)
  FinlSkFK

References

External links
 

1878 births
1968 deaths
Swedish Army generals
Swedish male sport shooters
Olympic shooters of Sweden
Shooters at the 1912 Summer Olympics
Military personnel from Stockholm
Commanders Grand Cross of the Order of the Sword
Commanders First Class of the Order of Vasa
Knights of the Order of the Polar Star
Members of the Royal Swedish Academy of War Sciences
Hugo
Recipients of orders, decorations, and medals of Ethiopia